Peter Elmander is a Swedish football player born on 25 April 1985.

He is the youngest of the  three Elmander brothers. His brothers Patrik and Johan are both professional football players.

From 2003 to 2006 he played for Holmalunds IF, just like both of his brothers. Peter had the opportunity to play with his older brother Patrik for a few seasons. In 2003 during a game against Örgryte IS, Elmander endured a nasty blow in which sidelined him until 2005.
In 2007, he was traded to Qviding FIF where he continues to play.

References

External links
Qviding FIFs official Website
Statistics

1985 births
Living people
Swedish footballers
Allsvenskan players
Eredivisie players
Association football forwards
Association football midfielders
Qviding FIF players
People from Alingsås